Baie-Sainte-Anne (2011 population: 1,387) is a rural community in Northumberland County, New Brunswick, Canada.

It is an acadian community located on the southern shore of Miramichi Bay near its opening into the Gulf of St. Lawrence.  Possibly named for Sainte-Anne, patroness of the Micmacs.  Peat farming and lobster processing are the area's major sources of income.

The local service district of Baie Ste. Anne takes its name from this community but spells it differently.

History

The community was founded in 1789 by Acadian settlers.

Education

Notable people

 Yvon Durelle - boxer
 Norbert Thériault - Canadian Senator
 Camille Thériault - Politician

See also
List of communities in New Brunswick

References

History of Baie-Sainte-Anne 

Communities in Northumberland County, New Brunswick
Local service districts of Northumberland County, New Brunswick